Atlanta Technical College (Atlanta Tech or ATC) is a public technical college in Atlanta, Georgia.  It is part of the Technical College System of Georgia (TCSG) and provides education services for Fulton and Clayton counties. Atlanta Tech is accredited by the Southern Association of Colleges and Schools to award associate degrees, diplomas, and technical certificates of credit.

History
ATC was originally established in 1945 after World War II as an adult vocational school named Smith-Hughes Vocational School. In 1964, the school's location was moved to Smith High School (now closed), and the school was renamed to Hoke Smith Technical Institute. At that time, about 24 occupational programs were offered.

In 1967, the school was reorganized as Atlanta Area Technical School and was moved to its current campus, holding the first classes in its new facilities in January 1968.

In 1997, the school's name was changed to Atlanta Technical Institute and the institution became part of the Georgia Department of Technical and Adult Education. On July 1, 2000, the name was changed to Atlanta Technical College.

Locations

Atlanta Tech's main campus is located at 1560 Metropolitan Parkway, SW, in Atlanta. The school also has an extension campus at 485 Atlanta South Pkwy, Atlanta, GA 30349.

References

External links
 Official website

Universities and colleges in Atlanta
Technological universities in the United States
Universities and colleges accredited by the Southern Association of Colleges and Schools
Education in Fulton County, Georgia
Education in Clayton County, Georgia
Technical College System of Georgia